All the Feels is the fourth studio album by the American neo-soul/pop band Fitz and the Tantrums, their first release since their self-titled album in 2016. It was released on September 20, 2019, through Elektra Records. The digital release of the album has 17 songs, and is the band's longest album to date.

Background 
Before the album was released, several singles were dropped over the course of a couple months. The first single, "123456", was released on March 20, 2019. A music video was released on the same day. The next one to be released was "Don't Ever Let 'Em" on April 17, 2019. This song was then followed by "I Need Help!", which was released on May 2, 2019. On June 28, the album was officially announced and able to be pre-ordered, and a song of the same name, "All the Feels", was also released on the same day. The music video "sees Fitz gain a brighter outlook on life after receiving (non-graphic) open-heart surgery." Another song, "I Just Wanna Shine", was released on July 14, 2019. The album was released on September 20.

In an interview, when asked his purpose in making the album, Fitzpatrick said he and the band "[had] been releasing songs every couple weeks." He continued, "[We're] giving people a preview of what it's gonna be like. What's really great is that you get to play it for your fans and right then and there, you kind get a get a sense of what they're feeling and the reaction has been amazing. We worked really hard on this record," he explained. "It's a big record, like 17 songs long, but we wanted to do all the feels." The band actually started with 80 songs and narrowed it down.

Billboard described the album as deep and emotional compared to the band's other works, with some of the "most raw of the songs they've released so far, with a pulsating melody to match the vulnerable - yet uplifting - lyrics like "We dive right into the deep end/ You win, you lose/ You get back up and try again." Another news magazine described the title track "All the Feels" as a song "about wanting more out of a relationship, really trying to feel a connection with somebody," and considered it to be a great summer song.

Touring 
The band started their first tour to promote the album with Young the Giant in North America on June 28, 2019, in Columbus, Ohio. It ended on August 16, 2019, in Las Vegas. Another tour after the album's release will pick up on February 28, 2020 in Chicago.

Track listing 

Note
 "Belladonna", "Kiss the Sky", and "Livin' for the Weekend" are only included on the digital version of the album.
  signifies a co-producer
  signifies an additional producer
  signifies a vocal producer

Personnel 
Fitz and the Tantrums
 Michael Fitzpatrick – vocals (all tracks), keyboards (tracks 1, 2, 4, 6, 16), drum programming (1), background vocals (2), drums (4, 16)
 Noelle Scaggs – vocals (all tracks), background vocals (2)
 James King – horn (1–3, 5), background vocals (2), saxophone (4, 8, 12, 13, 15, 17), baritone saxophone (7, 9, 11, 12, 14), keyboards (8, 12, 13, 15, 16), percussion (8, 12, 13, 15, 16), alto saxophone (10, 14, 16), tenor saxophone (10–12, 14, 16)
 Joseph Karnes – bass guitar (1–3, 5, 8, 11, 13–17), background vocals (2)
 Jeremy Ruzumna – keyboards (1–3, 5, 7–9, 11–17), background vocals (2), synthesizer (11)
 John Wicks – drums (1–3, 5, 7–9, 11–17), background vocals (2), percussion (6)

Additional musicians

 Wrabel – additional vocals (1)
 Isaiah Gage – cello (1)
 Ethan Bearman – horn (1), French horn (10, 17)
 Jordan Katz – horn (1, 5), trumpet (10–12, 17), piccolo trumpet (11, 12), trombone (11, 12)
 James Miller – horn (1), trombone (10, 17)
 Ron Blake – horn (1)
 Stephen "Johan" Feigenbaum – strings (1) 
 Yasmeen Al-Mazeedi – violin (1)
 Tommy English – keyboards (2, 6), programming (2, 9, 14), background vocals (2); drum programming, guitar (6)
 K.Flay – background vocals (2, 16)
 Rilo Karnes – background vocals (2)
 Theo Fitzpatrick – background vocals (2)
 Ruby Wicks – background vocals (2)
 Betty Wicks – background vocals (2)
 Raphael Ruzumna – background vocals (2)
 Lisa Nupoff – background vocals (2)
 Aaron Glas – background vocals (2)
 Julian King – background vocals (2)
 John Hill – keyboards, programming (2)
 Nick Long – guitar (3)
 Oren Yoel – guitar, keyboards (4, 11, 12); drums (4); programming, synthesizer (11, 12); bass guitar (12)
 Andrew Wells – background vocals, drums, guitar, percussion (5)
 Ammar Malik – background vocals (5)
 Busbee – bass guitar, keyboards, programming (7)
 Ryan Daly – guitar, keyboards, programming (7)
 Nick Ruth – guitar (8, 9); acoustic guitar, background vocals (8)
 Jonas Jeberg – bass guitar, drums, keyboards (10, 17)
 Devon Taylor – sousaphone (10, 17)
 David Ralicke – piccolo trumpet, trombone, trumpet (11, 12)
 Johnny What – bass guitar, drums, synthesizer (13)
 Jason Suwito – drums, keyboards (16)

Technical

 Michelle Mancini – mastering
 Manny Marroquin – mixing (1–3, 5, 7–9, 11–17)
 Justin Long – mixing (6), engineering (4, 6, 8, 9, 14, 16), additional engineering (1)
 Chris Galland – mix engineering (7–9, 12–16)
 Carlos de la Garza – engineering (1, 4, 6–8, 16)
 Rob Cohen – engineering (2), editing (1, 8, 16)
 Blake Mares – engineering (2)
 Suzy Chin – engineering (3)
 Andrew Wells – engineering (5)
 Jon Yeston – engineering (5)
 Busbee – engineering (7)
 Ryan Daly – engineering (7)
 Ryan Hewitt – engineering (10, 17)
 Doron Dina – engineering (11, 12)
 Johnny What – engineering (13)
 Jeremy Simoneaux – engineering assistance (1, 2, 5)
 Ryan Dulude – engineering assistance (1, 2, 5)
 Rachel White – engineering assistance (3)
 Nick Rives – engineering assistance (6–8, 11, 12)
 Collin Kadlec – engineering assistance (6, 8, 9, 14)
 Jeff Fitzpatrick – engineering assistance (17)

Artwork
 Tyler Spangler – art direction
 Nada Taha – art direction
 Luke Dickey – photography

References 

2019 albums
Fitz and The Tantrums albums
Elektra Records albums
Albums produced by busbee
Albums produced by John Hill (record producer)
Albums produced by Jake Sinclair (musician)